Kronobergshäktet (Kronoberg remand prison) is the largest remand prison in Sweden, with a capacity of 321 inmates. It's located the block Kronoberg on Kungsholmen in Stockholm.

Notable inmates
ASAP Rocky – arrested for assault in early July 2019 and remanded in custody at Kronobergshäktet.

References

Prisons in Sweden
Buildings and structures in Stockholm